Bride and Prejudice (also known as Bride and Prejudice: The Bollywood Musical) is a 2004 romantic drama film directed by Gurinder Chadha, director of Bend it Like Beckham (2002) and other films. The screenplay by Chadha and Paul Mayeda Berges is a Bollywood-style adaptation of Jane Austen's 1813 novel Pride and Prejudice. It was filmed primarily in English, with some Hindi and Punjabi dialogue. The film was released in the United Kingdom on 6 October 2004 and in the United States on 11 February 2005. It has received mostly positive reviews from critics.

Plot
Lalita Bakshi is a young woman living in Amritsar, India with her family. The family is invited to a friend's wedding ceremony, where Lalita meets Will Darcy, a handsome and wealthy American who is a long-time friend of the Indian-British barrister Balraj, and Balraj's sister Kiran. Balraj is instantly attracted to Jaya and likewise, Darcy is attracted to Lalita. During the wedding reception, Lalita takes a disliking to Darcy but when Balraj invites Jaya to Goa, Mr. Bakshi asks Lalita to go with them and she eventually agrees to do so. In Goa, Lalita and Darcy clash over their ideas on men and women and India's economic future. Later that night on the beach, Lalita meets Johnny Wickham, Darcy's former friend from London, and he validates her low opinion of Darcy.

The Bakshi family is visited by Kohli Saab, a family friend living in Los Angeles, who has come to India to find a "traditional woman" to marry. When Kohli Saab is attracted to Jaya, Mrs. Bakshi steers him towards Lalita, making Lalita uncomfortable. Wickham is invited to join the family and Kohli Saab at the Garba, despite Mrs. Bakshi's disapproval. Lalita happily accepts a dance from Wickham, even as Darcy and Kiran warn her against becoming involved with him. Lalita angers her mother by turning down a proposal from Kohli.

Balraj comes to the house to bid farewell to Jaya and promises to write to her from London. Lakhi later announces that Chandra is marrying Kohli Saab, much to the surprise of Jaya and especially Lalita. The same night, Wickham also announces that he is leaving and promises to write to Lalita. Neither Balraj nor Wickham writes to the two older sisters, but Wickham is shown secretly writing to Lakhi. Kohli Saab and Chandra phone to invite the Bakshi family the wedding ceremony in Los Angeles. The family accepts and Jaya is excited to stopover in London hoping to see Balraj again.

In London, Kiran informs the Bakshi family that Balraj is in New York to meet potential brides, devastating Jaya, Lalita and Mrs Bakshi. At Heathrow Airport, Lakhi, Jaya, Lalita and Mrs Bakshi coincidentally run into Darcy, who is also a guest at Kohli Saab and Chandra's wedding. On board Darcy offers his First class seat to Mrs. Bakshi so he can sit next to Lalita in Economy class for the remainder of the flight. During their stay in California, Lalita's opinion of Darcy slowly improves, and the two fall in love.

At the wedding, Darcy's condescending mother, Catherine, introduces Lalita to Darcy's former girlfriend, Anne who mispronounces Lalita's name as "Lolita". Jaya and Lalita also meet Darcy's younger sister, Georgie, who tells Lalita that Balraj and Darcy are not in contact because Darcy persuaded Balraj not to marry an Indian girl with a "gold-digger" Mother. Lalita furiously realizes that Darcy is the reason why Jaya never heard from Balraj. Darcy proposes to Lalita, who angrily refuses, blaming him for Jaya's unhappiness.

Back in London, Lakhi uses the family's layover as an opportunity to sneak away and meet Wickham. Darcy apologizes to Lalita, telling her that he has gotten Balraj to reconcile with Jaya. Lalita realizes that Darcy was right about Wickham and calls for his help to find Lakhi. Darcy explains that Wickham got Georgie pregnant at age 16, tried to marry her for their family's money, and ran away when his plan did not work. They both rescue Lakhi and Lalita accepts Darcy's proposal. The film ends with a double wedding of Jaya to Balraj and Lalita to Darcy.

Cast

Names in parentheses are the characters in the original Austen novel.

 Aishwarya Rai as Lalita Bakshi/Lalita Darcy (Elizabeth Bennet)
 Martin Henderson as William "Will" Darcy (Fitzwilliam Darcy)
 Anupam Kher as Mr Chaman Bakshi (Mr Bennet), Lalita's Father
 Nadira Babbar as Mrs Manorama Bakshi (Mrs Bennet), Lalita's Mother
 Naveen Andrews as Mr Balraj Uppal (Mr Bingley), Will's best friend
 Namrata Shirodkar as Jaya Bakshi/Jaya Uppal (Jane Bennet), Lalita's older sister
 Meghna Kothari as Maya Bakshi (Mary Bennet), Lalita's younger sister
 Peeya Rai Chowdhary as Lakhi Bakshi (Lydia Bennet), Lalita's youngest sister
 Indira Varma as Kiran (Caroline Bingley), Balraj's sister 
 Daniel Gillies as Johnny Wickham (George Wickham), Will's former friend
 Sonali Kulkarni as Chandra Lamba (Charlotte Lucas), Lalita's best friend
 Nitin Ganatra as Kohli Saab (Mr William Collins)
 Alexis Bledel as Georgina "Georgie" Darcy (Georgiana Darcy), Will's sister
 Marsha Mason as Catherine Darcy, (Catherine de Bourgh), Will's mother
 Shivani Ghai as Bride, Lalita's and Chandra's best friend
 Georgina Chapman as Anne, (Anne de Bourgh) Will's former girlfriend
 Harvey Virdi as Mrs Lamba, (Lady Lucas) Chandra's mother
 Mellan Mitchell as Bijili, Bakshi's servant
 Rick Warden as Neighbor
 Ashanti as herself in a special guest appearance

Soundtrack
The songs were composed by Anu Malik. The lyrics were written by Farhan Akhtar and Zoya Akhtar.

Production

Bride and Prejudice received funding from the UK Film Council with the stipulation that a majority of filming had to take place in the UK. Locations used include Halton House, Stoke Park Club, Turville, and Cobstone Windmill in Buckinghamshire, and Southall, Somerset House, Little Venice, the London Eye, and the National Film Theatre in London. Other locations include the Golden Temple of Amritsar, the beaches of Goa, the Grand Canyon, the Walt Disney Concert Hall in Los Angeles, and Santa Monica Beach.

Ashanti sings "Touch My Body" and Gayatri Iyer sings "Take me to love" in the film. According to director Gurinder Chadha in "making-of" extras on the DVD release, Ashanti's appearance is an homage to the tradition of a celebrity making a cameo appearance to sing an "item number", a song that has no direct involvement in the plot in Bollywood films.

Critical reception
The review aggregation website Rotten Tomatoes reported that 64% of critics have given the film a positive review based on 134 reviews, with an average rating of 6.10/10. The website's critics consensus reads, "A colorful and energetic adaptation of Austen's classic." On Metacritic, the film has a weighted average score of 55 out of 100 based on 34 critics, indicating "mixed or average reviews".

Peter Bradshaw from The Guardian reviewed, "Bride and Prejudice could be any unremarkable Bollywood picture". Stella Papamichael at the BBC noted that "swapping corsets for saris, and polite pianoforte for the bhangra beat, director Gurinder Chadha reinvigorates Jane Austen's Pride and Prejudice with fun and flamboyance".

References

External links

 
 

2004 romantic comedy films
2004 films
Films scored by Anu Malik
British Indian films
Films about Indian Americans
British romantic comedy films
British romantic musical films
2000s English-language films
English-language Indian films
Films about Indian weddings
Films about interracial romance
Films about weddings
Films based on Pride and Prejudice
Films directed by Gurinder Chadha
Films set in Amritsar
2000s Hindi-language films
2000s Punjabi-language films
American romantic musical films
Films with screenplays by Paul Mayeda Berges
Films with screenplays by Gurinder Chadha
Comedy films about Asian Americans
Asian-American romance films
Pathé films
2000s American films
2000s British films